Synaptic pharmacology is the study of drugs that act on the synapses. It deals with the composition, uses, and effects of drugs that may enhance (receptor) or diminish (blocker) activity at the synapse, which is the junction across which a nerve impulse passes from an axon terminal to a neuron, muscle cell, or gland cell.

A partial list of pharmacological agents that act at synapses follows.

References

Neuropharmacology